Çevrimova is a village in the Batman District of Batman Province in Turkey. The village is populated by Kurds of the Elîkan, Reman and Sinikan tribes and had a population of 1,056 in 2021.

References 

Villages in Batman District
Kurdish settlements in Batman Province